Thompson's Opera House, also known as Brown's Hall, Brown's Opera House or the Gem Theater, is a small theater building in Pioche, Nevada. The Opera House is a wood-frame building built in 1873, attached roughly to the adjoining brick Gem Theater, a 1937 masonry cinema.

The Opera House was used as a community meeting house, dance hall and theater. The theater was built by Aleck Brown in September 1873 and featured a performance of Pygmalion and Galatea for its opening night, with a cast of professional actors from San Francisco. The Opera House was purchased in 1891 by Alexander S. Thompson of Pioche.  Thompson renovated the floor and enlarged the stage. After Thompson's death in 1905 his sons Charles and Frank took over, remodeling in 1907. The Opera House screened its first silent movie in 1915.  In 1935 the Opera House was renamed the Gem Theater after Frank Thompson took over sole management, but in 1937 he built a new Gem Theater next door expressly for movies. The Opera House declined from that point.

The two story rectangular building shows elements of the Greek Revival style with its shallow front gable/pediment. It originally featured a one-story porch across the width of the facade with a balustrade above, removed but now restored. The front is covered with clapboards while the side and rear are sheathed in board and batten siding. The structure is framed with heavy timber in a post-and-beam arrangement. The ground floor housed commercial space and dressing rooms. The main hall is on the second floor, entered by steep stairs from the street. A shed-roofed addition to the rear is built into the hillside and houses the stage at the second floor level.

The Opera House was added to the National Register of Historic Places in 1984. It is one of three 19th century theaters remaining in Nevada.

References

Theatres on the National Register of Historic Places in Nevada
Theatres completed in 1873
Buildings and structures in Lincoln County, Nevada
Music venues completed in 1873
Opera houses in Nevada
National Register of Historic Places in Lincoln County, Nevada
Opera houses on the National Register of Historic Places
Event venues on the National Register of Historic Places in Nevada
1873 establishments in Nevada